Conservula v-brunneum is a moth of the family Noctuidae that was first described by Achille Guenée in 1852. It is found in Sri Lanka and India.

Its larval host plant is Pteridium aquilinum.

References

Moths of Asia
Moths described in 1852
Caradrinini